The 2012 Hesse Cup Final took place on 10 May 2012 in Marburg, a ground decided by the 2 finalists. The Winner will qualify for the 2012–13 DFB-Pokal, unless the winner already qualifies through their position in the league system. If the two finalists automatically qualify then the semi-finalists play a two legged play-off to decide, and so on. SV Wehen Wiesbaden are the holders after beating KSV Hessen Kassel 2–0 in the final.

Qualification

SV Wehen Wiesbaden, Kickers Offenbach and SV Darmstadt 98 automatically qualify for the Hesse Cup as they are in the 3. Liga. The winners of each RegionalCup inside Hesse qualify.

Qualified Teams

Automatic Qualification
SV Wehen Wiesbaden – 3. Liga

Kickers Offenbach – 3. Liga

SV Darmstadt 98 – 3. Liga

Qualification through Cup

Darmstadt Region Cup – Eintracht Wald-Michelbach (Verbandsliga)

Frankfurt Region Cup – Either Usinger TSG (Verbandsliga) or TGM SV Jügesheim (Hessenliga) – Final on 1 November 2011

Kassel Region Cup – Either KSV Hessen Kassel (Regionalliga) or 1. FC Schwalmstadt (Verbandsliga) – Final on 26 October 2011

Wiesbaden Region Cup – 1. FC Eschborn (Hessenliga)

Gießen/Marburg Region Cup  – Either FC Ederbergland (Verbandsliga or Eintracht Stadtallendorf (Hessenliga) – Final on 2 November 2011

Football competitions in Hesse